Taskin Ahmed Tazim (born 3 April 1994) is a Bangladeshi cricketer. He is a right-arm fast bowler and a left-handed batsman. He represents Dhaka Metropolis in first-class and List A cricket and the Rangpur Rangers franchise in the Bangladesh Premier League. Taskin Ahmed is the first Bangladeshi cricketer to take 5 wicket in ODI debut.

Early and domestic career
Taskin started cricket in Abahani playground on 10 January 2007. After playing under-15 and under-17 level, he was selected to play for the Bangladesh national under-19 cricket team. He made his first-class debut for Dhaka Metropolis in October 2011 against Barisal Division.

In the 2012 ICC Under-19 World Cup, Taskin was the highest wicket-taker for Bangladesh, taking 11 wickets. In his second Twenty20 in the BPL 2 for the Chittagong Kings, he was named man of the match for his bowling figures of 4/31 against Duronto Rajshahi in the semi-final. He took 8 wickets in 4 matches which was the most important turning point of his career.

In BPL 3, Taskin played for Chittagong Vikings. He became the 4th most searched person of 2015 in Google from Bangladesh.

In October 2018, Taskin was named in the squad for the Sylhet Sixers team  following the draft for the 2018–19 Bangladesh Premier League. He was the leading wicket-taker for the team in the tournament, with twenty-two dismissals in twelve matches. In November 2019, he was selected to play for the Rangpur Rangers in the 2019–20 Bangladesh Premier League.

In November 2021, he was selected to play for the Colombo Stars following the players' draft for the 2021 Lanka Premier League.

International career

Debut
The door of national team opened for him suddenly in case of Mashrafe's injury. He made his T20I debut on 1 April 2014 and took the wicket of Glenn Maxwell in T20I debut.

On 17 June 2014, he took 5 wickets against India as the first Bangladeshi ODI debut bowler.

Taskin made his Test debut for Bangladesh against New Zealand on 12 January 2017 and picked up his maiden test wicket dismissing Kane Williamson.

Taskin was selected in Bangladesh's squad for the 2015 Cricket World Cup for his outstanding performance in domestic cricket in 2014 season. In group stage of WC, he took one wicket against Afghanistan, three against Scotland and two against England, which had a very important role to qualify in the quarter-final where Bangladesh faced India was in Melbourne, the World Cup quarter-final. Taskin impressed again by taking three wickets. He was the highest wicket-taker from Bangladesh in the world cup. The epic celebration between Taskin and Mashrafe after getting wicket called "Chest-bump" was nominated as one of the most memorable moments of the world cup by cricketcountry.com .

Rise of Taskin
Taskin had an important role to whitewashing Pakistan in April 2015 and winning against India in June 2015.

In 2016, Taskin was selected in Bangladesh's squad for the 2016 ICC World Twenty20. However, he was later suspended from bowling in international cricket due to an illegal action bowled during the tournament.

In June 2021, he was named in the Bangladesh's squad across all formats for their tour to Zimbabwe. In the only Test match against Zimbabwe, he scored 75 runs and claimed his maiden half-century in Test cricket. He sustained a partnership of 191 runs along with Mahmudullah, which was the second highest ninth wicket partnership in Test cricket. Taskin's 75 runs was also the highest individual score at number 10 by a Bangladeshi batsman in away.

In September 2021, he was named in Bangladesh's squad for the 2021 ICC Men's T20 World Cup. In 2022 T20 World Cup, he became the most wicket taker from Bangladesh by taking 8 wickets in 5 matches.

Bowling speed
Taskin is currently the fastest bowler in the history of Bangladesh cricket. During the 2021 T-20 World Cup, Taskin clocked 150+km/h in a match, where Mashrafe Mortaza, previous fastest, has clocked 148 km/h during a Test against New Zealand at Hamilton in 2001.

Personal life
Taskin is the son of businessman Abdur Rashid and Sabina Yasmin. Taskin completed SSC from King Khaled Institute and HSC from Stamford College. He then studied at American International University-Bangladesh (AIUB).

In November 2017, Taskin married his childhood friend Sayeda Rabeya Nayeem. On 30 September 2018, their first child, Tashfeen Ahmed Rihan was born.

References

External links
 
 

Living people
1995 births
Cricketers from Dhaka
Bangladeshi cricketers
Bangladesh Test cricketers
Bangladesh One Day International cricketers
Bangladesh Twenty20 International cricketers
Dhaka Metropolis cricketers
Cricketers who have taken five wickets on One Day International debut
Cricketers at the 2015 Cricket World Cup
Asian Games medalists in cricket
Cricketers at the 2014 Asian Games
Asian Games bronze medalists for Bangladesh
Medalists at the 2014 Asian Games
Abahani Limited cricketers
Prime Bank Cricket Club cricketers
Chattogram Challengers cricketers
Sylhet Strikers cricketers
Bangladesh Central Zone cricketers
Bangladesh A cricketers
One Day International hat-trick takers
Kandahar Knights cricketers
American International University-Bangladesh alumni